Dennis Tuffour is an English former professional rugby league footballer who played in the 2010s.

Background
Dennis Tuffour was born in London, England, and he is of Anglo/Ghanaianian descent.

Career
He had a dual contract agreement with Hull F.C. and Championship side the York City Knights. He was handed his first professional contract with Hull F.C. in 2010 after an impressive season with Andy Last's Under-20s team. Tuffour is a talented all round sportsman, Tuffour has won national awards in pool as well as having trials with Premier League football side Tottenham Hotspur. It was due to a cancelled trial with Tottenham Hotspur where he discovered rugby league as he watched and then trained with rugby League side the London Skolars. He came to Hull FC's youth academy from Harlequins RL as he was studying at University of Hull.

York City Knights
Tuffour made a try scoring début for the York City Knights against Gateshead Thunder were he slide over in the 43rd minute to cap off an impressive début. He also scored in the York City Knights' Challenge Cup 4th round tie against Super League club Crusaders RL.

Hunslet Hawks

Tuffour headed to the newly promoted Hunslet Hawks for the 2011 Championship season.

References

External links
Hull Profile
 (archived by web.archive.org) Stats → Past Players → T at hullfc.com
 (archived by web.archive.org) Statistics at hullfc.com

1989 births
Living people
Doncaster R.L.F.C. players
English people of Iranian descent
English rugby league players
Hull F.C. players
Hunslet R.L.F.C. players
London Skolars players
Rugby league wingers
Rugby league players from London
York City Knights players